"Chocolat" is a song by Lartiste featuring vocals from Awa Imani. The song peaked at number three in France and was Lartiste's most successful single until Mafiosa in 2018. The song's lyrics are about the racism of the black women in France. The music video has over 454 million views.

Charts

Certifications

References 

2016 songs
2017 singles
French-language songs